Pakistan competed at the 2022 Commonwealth Games at Birmingham, England from 28 July to 8 August 2022. It was Pakistan's 14th appearance at the Commonwealth Games.

Muhammad Inam and Bismah Maroof were the country's flagbearers at the 2022 Commonwealth Games opening ceremony.

Arshad Nadeem won Pakistan's first ever gold medal in Javelin Throw at the Commonwealth Games and the first Athletics gold medal since 1962. This is the best medal haul for Pakistan at the Commonwealth Games since 1970. Overall Pakistan finished at 18 on the medal table out of 72 participating nations.

Administration
Syed Mohammad Abid Qadri was the Chef de Mission for the Pakistani team in Birmingham.

Competitors
The following is the list of number of competitors participating at the Games per sport/discipline.

Notes

Medallists

Athletics

A squad of five athletes was officially confirmed as of 19 July 2022.

Men
Track and road events

Field events

Women
Track and road events

Field events

Badminton

Pakistan received a Bipartite Invitation for the mixed team competition. A squad of four players was selected shortly after the selection trials on 12 May 2022.

Mixed team

Summary

Squad

Murad Ali
Muhammad Irfan Saeed Bhatti
Mahoor Shahzad
Ghazala Siddique

Group stage

Boxing

A squad of five boxers was officially confirmed as of 19 July 2022.

Cricket

By virtue of its position in the ICC Women's T20I rankings (as of 1 April 2021), Pakistan qualified for the tournament.

Fixtures were announced in November 2021.

Roster
Fifteen players were selected on 31 May 2022.

 Bismah Maroof (c)
 Muneeba Ali (wk)
 Anam Amin
 Aiman Anwer
 Diana Baig
 Nida Dar
 Gull Feroza (wk)
 Tuba Hassan
 Kainat Imtiaz
 Sadia Iqbal
 Iram Javed
 Ayesha Naseem
 Aliya Riaz
 Fatima Sana
 Omaima Sohail

Summary

Group play

Gymnastics

One gymnast was officially selected as of 19 July 2022.

Artistic
Men
Individual Qualification

Hockey

By virtue of its position in the FIH Men's World Ranking (as of 1 February 2022), Pakistan qualified for the men's tournament.

Detailed fixtures were released on 9 March 2022. Eighteen players were selected for the men's squad as of 13 July 2022.

Men's tournament

Summary

Roster

Akmal Hussain (gk)
Abdullah Ishtiaq (gk)
Mubashir Ali
Ammad Butt
Mohammad Hammad
Muhammad Abdullah
Rizwan Ali
Muhammad Umar Bhutta
Moin Shakeel
Abdul Mannan
Junaid Manzoor
Ghazanfar Ali
Ajaz Ahmed
Rana Waheed
Ruman Khan
Afraz Hakeem
Hannan Shahid
Ahmed Nadeem

Group play

Seventh place match

Judo

Two judoka were selected for the competition.

Men

Squash

A squad of four players was officially confirmed as of 19 July 2022.

Singles

Doubles

Swimming

A squad of four swimmers was officially confirmed as of 19 July 2022.

Men

Women

Table tennis

Four players were initially selected on 16 March 2022; it was later confirmed on 13 May 2022 that only one player (Fahad Khawaja) would go to the Games.

Weightlifting

The PWF was set to send six qualified weightlifters to Birmingham but a doping scandal means that only three are provisionally set to attend the Games.

Men

Wrestling

Following the trials, five male wrestlers were selected on 2 April 2022, with a sixth added to the squad at a later date.

Doping

Disqualified medal

Ali Asad was stripped of his medal due to testing positive for performance enhancement drugs.

See also
Pakistan at the 2022 Winter Olympics
Pakistan at the 2022 Asian Games

Notes

References

External links
Pakistan Olympic Association Official site

Nations at the 2022 Commonwealth Games
Pakistan at the Commonwealth Games
2022 in Pakistani sport